Sigmund von Imhoff (30 June 1881 – 7 July 1967) was a Generalmajor in the Luftwaffe during World War II.

Biography 
Wilhelm Maria Sigmund Heinrich, Freiherr von Imhoff, was born a member of the Imhoff family in Metz, Lorraine, on 30 June 1881. His father, Christoph Gustav Karl Sigmund was an officer at Metz, a border town of the German Empire.

Sigmund von Imhoff served as officer in the German Army during the First World War. After the War, von Imhoff served as officer in the Landespolizei Freistaates of Bayern, the Bavarian police. On 3 April 1933, Sigmund von Imhoff was promoted to the rank of Polizeigeneral, general in the police. His son, Sigmund, Major in the Heer, fell on the Russian front in August 1941. Sigmund von Imhoff was later seconded to the Luftwaffe, with the rank of Generalmajor.

Wilhelm Maria Sigmund Heinrich, Freiherr von Imhoff, died in Farchant, Oberbayern, on 7 July 1967.

References

Bibliography

 Dieter Zinke, Andreas Schulz : Die Generale der Waffen-SS und der Polizei - volume 3, Biblio-Verlag, Bissendorf, 2008 (p645- 651).

1881 births
1967 deaths
Luftwaffe World War II generals
German Army personnel of World War I
Bavarian nobility
Military personnel from Metz
People from Alsace-Lorraine
German police chiefs
Barons of Germany
Major generals of the Luftwaffe